Emanuela (minor planet designation: 576 Emanuela) is an asteroid orbiting the Sun.

References

External links 
 
 

000576
Discoveries by Paul Götz
Named minor planets
19050922